Crystal Springs hot springs is a system of geothermal springs and seeps near Ash Springs, located at the site of a ghost town, Crystal Springs, Nevada. Several marshes and springs are located along the White River.

Location
The spring area is located off the Extraterrestrial Highway in a remote area of the Nevada high desert near Nellis Air Force Base. There is a large soaking pool fed by the spring water. GPS coordinates are N 37 31.920 W 115 13.980 The nearly ghost town of Crystal Springs is located at the Nevada Historical Marker 205 (Crystal Springs), in the Pahranagat Valley region of Lincoln County, Nevada. Crystal Spring area was major site for stopovers on the alternate route of the Mormon trail, and later became a stagecoach stop and the first Lincoln County seat.

Water profile
The hot mineral water emerges from the ground at 90°F/32°C. Water spraying from the irrigation pipe that is channeled into the soaking pool is 81°F. A rare species of freshwater snail lives in the warm spring water, the Crystal Spring Pyrgulopsis crystalis.

See also
 List of hot springs in the United States
 List of hot springs in the world

References

Hot springs of Nevada
Lincoln County, Nevada